Harpulina lapponica is a species of sea snail, a marine gastropod mollusk in the family Volutidae, the volutes.

Subspecies 
 Harpulina lapponica lapponica (Linnaeus, 1767)
Harpulina lapponica loroisi (Valenciennes, 1863)

Description
The length of the shell attains 79 mm.

Distribution
This marine species is native to the Indian Ocean, particularly Sri Lanka. Despite the specific epithet lapponica, it is not native to Lapland.

References

  Bail P. & Poppe G.T. 2001. A conchological iconography: a taxonomic introduction of the recent Volutidae. ConchBooks, Hackenheim. 30 pp, 5 pl.

External links
 Linnaeus, C. (1767). Systema naturae per regna tria naturae: secundum classes, ordines, genera, species, cum characteribus, differentiis, synonymis, locis. Ed. 12. 1., Regnum Animale. 1 & 2. Holmiae, Laurentii Salvii. Holmiae [Stockholm, Laurentii Salvii. pp. 1–532 [1766] pp. 533–1327 1767 ]
 Sowerby, G. B., I. (1845). Monograph of the genus Voluta. In G. B. Sowerby II (ed.), Thesaurus conchyliorum, or monographs of genera of shells. Vol. 1 (5): 191–220, pls 46-55. London, privately published
 MNHN, Paris: holotype

Volutidae
Gastropods described in 1767
Taxa named by Carl Linnaeus